"Afternoons & Coffeespoons" is a song by Canadian rock band Crash Test Dummies and is the third single from the 1993 album God Shuffled His Feet. "Afternoons & Coffeespoons" has been called the band's most popular song amongst fans. It is also one of their most successful songs commercially, peaking at number two in Iceland, number seven in Canada, number 16 in Finland, and number 66 in the United States.

Background
The title and lyrics of the song reference the 1915 T. S. Eliot poem "The Love Song of J. Alfred Prufrock". Lead vocalist Brad Roberts called it "a song about being afraid of getting old, which is a reflection of my very neurotic character".

Critical reception
Larry Flick of Billboard called "Afternoons & Coffeespoon" "another winner" for the band, writing that although it did not live up to the catchiness of "Mmm Mmm Mmm Mmm", it was a "very hummable" song.

Music video
The music video features Brad Roberts as a patient in a hospital, with the rest of the band playing the doctors operating on him.

Charts

Weekly charts

Year-end charts

References

1994 songs
1994 singles
Adaptations of works by T. S. Eliot
Arista Records singles
Crash Test Dummies songs
Songs based on poems
Song recordings produced by Jerry Harrison
Songs written by Brad Roberts